Evan Harrison (born February 3, 1970) is an American marketing person.

Biography
Harrison was with BMG Entertainment for 10 years in distribution and marketing roles, and helped launch its Click2Music.com site.

Harrison was vice-president and general manager of AOL Music and the AOL Radio Network. Before leading the network, Harrison managed day-to-day operations.

Harrison joined Clear Channel Radio in 2004, where he was executive vice president and was president of its digital division.  During his tenure, Clear Channel launched iHeartRadio, a digital web service that took radio beyond streaming audio, by emphasizing original content, including video.

Harrison served on the board of directors of the Keep a Child Alive organization and is Little Kids Rock.

On June 12, 2009, Harrison became the chief executive officer of Artist Personal Experience Radio, a joint venture between Clear Channel Radio and Front Line Management, that allows musicians to produce their own online radio shows. The first three stations were hosted by the Eagles, Christina Aguilera and Weezer. On November 22, 2010, Linkin Park partnered with A.P.E. Radio to launch "Linkin Park Radio."

In March 2010, Harrison helped launch Dream Radio to support Simon Fuller's  online entertainment program If I Can Dream. Clear Channel Radio helped lay the groundwork by introducing the program’s cast.
In June 2011 he became chief creative officer at Van Wagner Communications.

Further reading

 Tricia Duryee, mocoNews.net - iheartradio, mocoNews.net, July 26, 2010
 Andrew Hampp, Ad Age Entertainment A-List 2010 – #4: Clear Channel, adage.com, May 24, 2010
 Brian Garrity, Billboard - Changing the Channel, billboard.com, June 2, 2007
 Bob Tedeschi, NY Times – Online Radio, nytimes.com, July 18, 2005
 David Lieberman, USA Today - Billboard, usatoday.com, July 22, 2009
 Andrew Hampp, Ad Age – If I Can Dream, adage.com, December 17, 2009
 Antony Bruno, Billboard - Radio Waves, billboard.com, May 24, 2008
 Heather Green, Bloomberg Business Week – Podcast w’ Clear Channel’s Evan Harrison, businessweek.com, January 18, 2006
 Matthew Flamm, Crain’s – Musician Focused Channel, crainsnewyork.com, June 12, 2009
 Deborah Yao, Huffington Post - IHR, huffingtonpost.com, June 8, 2009
 Media Week Most Influential Executives Shaping the Future of Media - # 31 Evan Harrison, mediaweek.com, September 17, 2009
 Alexandra Wolfe, NY Observer – Power Punk: Evan Harrison Archive link, observer.com, December 14, 2003
 John R. Quian, NY Times – Will the Internet Kill Traditional Car Radio, nytimes.com, May 6, 2010
 Radio Ink - IHR, radioink.com, May 27, 2010
 Tricia Duryee, Mobile & Online Audience, washingtonpost.com, March 16, 2009

References 

Living people
American radio executives
1970 births